Romansa is a 2012 Indonesian-language album by .

Track listing
 Kamulah Satu-Satunya
 Pertama
 Bawa Daku Pergi
 Perawan Cinta
 Memori
 Tak Kan Ada Cinta Yang Lain
 Selamanya Cinta
 Ingin Ku miliki

References 

2012 albums